Baptist Noel (2 November 1658 – 28 July 1690) was an English politician. He was a Member of Parliament (MP) for Rutland.

Baptist Noel was born on 2 November 1658. He was the second surviving son of Baptist Noel, 3rd Viscount Campden and Elizabeth Bertie. He succeeded his half-brother Henry in 1677.

He was a Justice of the Peace (JP) for Rutland from 1685 until his death and a JP and Deputy Lieutenant for Leicestershire from 1689 to his death. He was elected a Tory knight of the shire (MP) for Rutland in March 1685.

He died aged 31 and was buried at Exton, Rutland. He had married Susannah, daughter and heiress of Sir Thomas Fanshawe of Jenkins, Barking, Essex. They had a son and three daughters. He was succeeded by the son Baptist who became the third Earl of Gainsborough.

References

 NOEL, Hon Baptist (1658-90) of North Luffenham, Rutland

1658 births
1690 deaths
People from North Luffenham
English MPs 1685–1687
Baptist
Younger sons of viscounts